David Joseph Osmek (born October 11, 1964) is an American politician and businessman who is a member of the Minnesota Senate. He has served as the 16th President of the Minnesota Senate since 2022. A member of the Republican Party of Minnesota, Osmek represents District 33 in the western Twin Cities metropolitan area.

Early life and education
Osmek was born in Glencoe, Minnesota. He attended St. Cloud State University, graduating with a B.E.S.

Minnesota Senate
Osmek was first elected to the Minnesota Senate in 2012.

In 2021, amid protests for racial justice during the trial of Derek Chauvin, he introduced a bill that would make people convicted of a crime at a protest ineligible for student loans and other state financial aid.

Personal life
Osmek is married to Kari. They have two children and reside in Mound, Minnesota, where Osmek served on the city council. He is a project manager.

References

External links

Senator David Osmek official Minnesota Senate website

1964 births
21st-century American politicians
Living people
Minnesota city council members
Republican Party Minnesota state senators
People from Glencoe, Minnesota
People from Mound, Minnesota
St. Cloud State University alumni